The Shops at Merrick Park is an outdoor shopping mall in Coral Gables, Florida. Its anchor stores are Neiman Marcus, Nordstrom, and Equinox Fitness.

The mall opened in 2002.

References

External links

Official website

Buildings and structures in Coral Gables, Florida
Shopping malls in Miami-Dade County, Florida
Shopping malls established in 2002
2002 establishments in Florida
Brookfield Properties